Lemvig Museum is a local museum in Lemvig, Denmark.

It has a number of exhibits about local points of interest,  which is the subject of a major multimedia exhibition. Most notably is the  exhibition of the Russian frigate Alexander Nevsky which wrecked in September 1868  on the coast between Harboøre and Thyborøn.

The museum features works by several local artists including sculptor Torvald Westergaard  (1901-1988) and the painters  Niels Bjerre (1864–1942),   Kristen Bjerre  (1869–1943) and  Jens Søndergaard (1895-1957)  presented at the museum.  Also featured as part of the museum is the "Planetary Path," a trail which features a model of the Solar System at a 1 to 1 billion scale.

See also
 Solar System model

References

External links
Lemvig museum Official site

Museums in the Central Denmark Region
Buildings and structures in Lemvig Municipality
Local museums in Denmark
Museum